Enations are scaly leaflike structures, differing from leaves in their lack of vascular tissue. They are created by some leaf diseases and occur normally on Psilotum. Enations are also found on some early plants such as Rhynia, where they are hypothesized to have aided in photosynthesis.

References 

Plant morphology
Botanical nomenclature